Kubo and the Two Strings is a 2016 American stop-motion animated action fantasy film produced by Laika. It is directed by Travis Knight (in his feature directorial debut) with a screenplay by Marc Haimes and Chris Butler from a story by Shannon Tindle and Marc Haimes, and it stars the voice roles of Charlize Theron, Art Parkinson, Ralph Fiennes, George Takei, Cary-Hiroyuki Tagawa, Brenda Vaccaro, Rooney Mara, and Matthew McConaughey. The film revolves around Kubo, a young boy who wields a magical  (a Japanese stringed instrument) and whose left eye was stolen during infancy. Accompanied by an anthropomorphic snow monkey and beetle, he must embark on a quest to defeat his mother's evil twin Sisters and his power-hungry grandfather, the Moon King, who is responsible for stealing his left eye.

Laika's production designer Shannon Tindle pitched the fantasy story stop-motion animated film based on samurais to Knight. By December 2014, Laika announced that Kubo and the Two Strings would be released in August 2016, with Knight to direct and produce the project, as well as the voice casting announcement. He was enthusiastic about the project by owing partly his affinity towards both the "epic fantasy" genre as well as Japanese culture in general, despite the studio never ventured into the genre before. The stop-motion animation were inspired by Japanese media such as ink wash painting and origami among others. Assistance came from 3D printing firm Stratasys who allowed Laika to use their newest technologies in exchange for feedback on them. According to Knight, he mentioned that the story for the film was partly inspired by works of Japanese animator Hayao Miyazaki. Dario Marianelli, who composed the music for Laika's one prior film, returned to compose the film's musical score for its second.

Kubo and the Two Strings premiered at Melbourne International Film Festival on August 13, 2016 and was released by Focus Features in the United States on August 19. The film received critical acclaim for its craftsmanship, musical score, and story, but received criticism for its perceived whitewashing casting choice, and it was a box-office disappointment, grossing $77 million worldwide against a $60 million budget. The film won the BAFTA Award for Best Animated Film, and was nominated for Academy Awards for Best Animated Feature and Best Visual Effects, becoming the second stop-motion animated film ever to be nominated in the latter category following 1993's The Nightmare Before Christmas, and the first Laika film to be nominated for both.

Plot

In feudal Japan, a 12-year-old boy with only one eye named Kubo tends to his ill mother in a mountain cave near a village. He earns their living by magically manipulating origami with music from his  for the village folk, telling the tale of his missing father Hanzo, a samurai warrior. Kubo is never able to finish his story, as he does not know what happened to Hanzo and his mother cannot recall the end due to her deteriorating mental state. His mother warns him not to stay out after dark as her Sisters, and his grandfather, the Moon King (who took his eye when he was a baby) will find him and take his remaining eye.

One day, Kubo learns of the village's Bon festival allowing them to speak to deceased loved ones. Kubo attends but is angry that Hanzo does not appear from his lantern, and forgets to return home before sunset. The Sisters quickly find him and attack, but his mother suddenly appears and uses her magic to send Kubo far away, telling him to find his father's armor.

Kubo wakes up in a distant land to find Monkey, his wooden snow monkey charm, has come alive. Monkey tells him his mother is gone and the village destroyed. With help of "Little Hanzo", an origami figure based on Kubo's father, they set out to find the armor. Along the way, they meet Beetle, an amnesiac samurai who was cursed to take the form of a stag beetle/human hybrid but believes himself to have been Hanzo's apprentice.

Kubo, Monkey, and Beetle reclaim the "Sword Unbreakable" from a cave guarded by a giant skeleton. They cross the Long Lake in a leaf boat to locate the "Breastplate Impenetrable" deep underwater. Kubo and Beetle swim down to retrieve it and encounter a sea monster, the "Garden of Eyes", who first uses its many eyes to entrance its victims by showing them visions of secrets, then eats them. Kubo is caught in the creature's sight, but while entranced, comes to realize that Monkey is the reincarnated spirit of his mother. Beetle rescues the unconscious Kubo and obtains the Breastplate, but on returning to the boat, they find that Monkey has been badly wounded fighting and vanquishing one of the Sisters.

They go to shore to recover, where Monkey explains that she and her Sisters were ordered by the Moon King to kill Hanzo, but she instead fell in love with him, and the Moon King branded her an enemy. That night, Kubo dreams of meeting a blind elderly man, who points him towards the "Helmet Invulnerable" in Hanzo's abandoned fortress. They travel there the next day but realize too late it is a trap set by the Moon King and the remaining Sister. The Sister reveals that Beetle is Hanzo, whom they cursed for taking their sister away from them, and kills Hanzo. Monkey sacrifices herself, buying Kubo the time to use his  to vanquish the Sister, breaking two of the three strings on it. Little Hanzo provides insight to Kubo that the Helmet is actually the bell at the village, and Kubo breaks the last string to quickly travel there.

At the village, Kubo meets the old man from his dream, who is revealed as the Moon King. He offers to take Kubo's other eye to make him immortal, but Kubo refuses. The Moon King transforms into a giant Dunkleosteus-like dragon, the Moon Beast, and pursues Kubo and the remaining villagers into its cemetery. When the armor proves ineffective, Kubo removes it and restrings his  using his mother's hair, his father's bowstring, and his own hair. With the instrument, he summons the spirits of the villagers' loved ones, who show the Moon King that memories are the strongest magic of all and can never be destroyed. Kubo and the spirits' magic protect themselves and the villagers from the Moon King, stripping him of his powers and leaving him a mortal human without any memories. Spurred on by Kubo's stories, the villagers choose compassion and tell him he was a man of many positive traits, accepting him into the village. Kubo is able to speak to his parents' ghosts during the subsequent Bon ceremony, as they watch the deceased villagers' lanterns transform into golden herons and fly to the spirit world.

Voice cast
 Art Parkinson as Kubo, an adventurous 12-year-old boy who can move origami
 Charlize Theron as Kubo's Mother/Monkey, the latter being a reincarnation of the former
 Matthew McConaughey as Beetle/Hanzo, respectively Kubo's father and a cursed bug version of the latter
 Ralph Fiennes as the Moon King, Kubo's grandfather who stole Kubo's left eye
 Rooney Mara as Mother's younger twin Sisters tasked with taking Kubo's eye by the Moon King
 George Takei as Hosato
 Brenda Vaccaro as Kameyo, Kubo's elderly friend
 Cary-Hiroyuki Tagawa as Hashi

Production

Development

Announced by the stop-motion animation studio Laika in December 2014, the project is the directorial debut of Laika's CEO Travis Knight. Laika's production designer Shannon Tindle pitched the story to Knight as a "stop-motion samurai epic". Although the studio had never ventured into the genre before, Knight was enthusiastic about the project; owing partly his affinity towards both the "epic fantasy" genre as well as Japanese culture in general.

The art took inspiration from such Japanese media as ink wash painting and origami among others. A particular influence came from the ukiyo-e woodblock style, with Laika intending to make the entire film "to look and feel as if it's a moving woodblock print" Assistance came from 3D printing firm Stratasys who allowed Laika to use their newest technologies in exchange for feedback on them. Knight mentioned that the story for the film was partly inspired by works of Japanese animator Hayao Miyazaki.

For the Skeleton monster the team created a giant ,  puppet, which Laika claims is the record holder for largest stop-motion puppet. The idea to make such a massive puppet was born out of a fear that individual smaller parts (meant to represent the larger monster) would not work well on screen interacting with the other puppets. The resulting puppet was built in two parts which were then attached together by magnets. For movement Laika had to design a robot to easily manipulate it. The team at one point purchased an industrial robot from eBay but found that it would not work with their setup.
A small portion of the production was released on YouTube.

Casting
On December 22, 2014, Art Parkinson, Matthew McConaughey, Charlize Theron, Rooney Mara, Ralph Fiennes and Brenda Vaccaro joined the voice cast.

Music

Dario Marianelli composed and conducted the score for the film. The score album featuring 16 tracks, including a rendition of The Beatles' track, "While My Guitar Gently Weeps" by Regina Spektor, was released by Warner Records on August 5, 2016.

Release
Kubo and the Two Strings screened at the Melbourne International Film Festival on August 13, 2016, and was theatrically released in the United States on August 19, 2016.

Box office
Kubo and the Two Strings grossed $48 million in North America and $29.5 million in other territories for a worldwide total of $77.5 million, against a budget of $60 million.

In the United States, the film was released on August 19, 2016, alongside Ben-Hur and War Dogs, and was projected to gross $12–15 million from 3,260 theaters in its opening weekend with some going as high as $17–20 million. It made $515,000 from its Thursday night previews and $4.1 million on its first day. It went on to gross $12.6 million in its opening weekend, finishing 4th at the box office behind War Dogs, Sausage Party and Suicide Squad.<ref name="opening">{{cite web|url=https://deadline.com/2016/08/ben-hur-war-dogs-suicide-squad-sausage-party-weekend-box-office-1201805947/ |first=Anthony |last=D'Alessandro |date=August 22, 2016 |title=War Dogs' Begins Barking On Thursday Night – Box Office |publisher=Penske Business Media|work=Deadline Hollywood|access-date=August 22, 2016}}</ref>

Critical response
Review aggregation website Rotten Tomatoes gives the film an approval rating of 97% based on reviews from 228 critics, with an average rating of 8.40/10. The website's critical consensus reads, "Kubo and the Two Strings matches its incredible animation with an absorbing—and bravely melancholy—story that has something to offer audiences of all ages." On Metacritic, the film has a weighted average score of 84 out of 100, based on 38 critics, indicating "universal acclaim". Audiences polled by CinemaScore gave the film an average grade of "A" on an A+ to F scale, while PostTrak reported filmgoers gave it an 85% overall positive score and a 63% "definite recommend".

Christy Lemire of RogerEbert.com awarded the film three and a half out of four stars, saying that "one of the most impressive elements of Kubo and the Two Strings—besides its dazzling stop-motion animation, its powerful performances and its transporting score—is the amount of credit it gives its audience, particularly its younger viewers." IGN's Samantha Ladwig gave the film 7.5/10, stating that the film is "Dark, twisted, and occasionally scary, but also with humor, love, and inspiration." Jesse Hassenger, of The A.V. Club, praised the film, saying that "no American animation studio is better-suited to dreamlike plotting than Laika, and the animation of Kubo is truly dazzling, mixing sophistication and handmade charm with inspired flow."

Michael O'Sullivan of The Washington Post gave the film four out of four stars, stating that the film is "both extraordinarily original and extraordinarily complex, even for a grown-up movie masquerading as a kiddie cartoon (which it kind of is)." In The New York Times, Glenn Kenny said that "the movie's blend of stop-motion animation for the main action with computer-generated backgrounds is seamless, creating what is the most visually intoxicating of all Laika's movies." Peter Debruge of Variety wrote that ""Kubo" offers another ominous mission for a lucky young misfit, this one a dark, yet thrilling adventure quest that stands as the crowning achievement in Laika's already impressive oeuvre." Jordan Hoffman of The Guardian was more critical of the film, giving it a two out of five stars and saying that "Older kids, except for a few teacher’s pets, will soon realise that this is hardly a fun action-adventure cartoon at all, but a plate of vegetables."

Jonathan Pile of Empire, wrote of the film: "Yet another success for stop-motion giants Laika … boasts big laughs and effective scares in a typically gorgeous animated tale."

 Casting criticism 
While the film received critical acclaim for its craft and story, it was criticized for its perceived whitewashing as a movie set in ancient Japan but featuring a centrally white voice cast. George Takei and Cary-Hiroyuki Tagawa were the only actors of Asian descent and both played minor characters.

Accolades

At the 89th Academy Awards, Kubo and the Two Strings was nominated for two awards, Best Animated Feature and Best Visual Effects, but lost to two Disney films respectively: Zootopia and The Jungle Book.

Home mediaKubo and the Two Strings was released on DVD, Blu-ray, and digital media on November 22, 2016, a new edition from Shout! Factory under license from Universal was released in September 2021.

Video game
A game called Kubo: A Samurai Quest'' was released for iOS and Android on August 20, 2016.

See also
 Whitewashing in film

References

External links

 
 
 
 
 
 Official screenplay

2016 3D films
2016 animated films
2016 films
2010s American animated films
2010s fantasy adventure films
American action adventure films
American 3D films
American children's animated adventure films
American children's animated fantasy films
American fantasy adventure films
Anime-influenced Western animation
Annie Award winners
Best Animated Feature BAFTA winners
Films scored by Dario Marianelli
Animated films about music and musicians
Films about shapeshifting
Films set in feudal Japan
Focus Features films
Focus Features animated films
Laika (company) animated films
Films about magic
Moon in film
Fiction about origami
2010s stop-motion animated films
3D animated films
Films directed by Travis Knight
2016 directorial debut films
Japan in non-Japanese culture
Casting controversies in film
American animated feature films
Film controversies
Race-related controversies in animation
Race-related controversies in film
2010s English-language films